Alice Mann (born 1979/1980) is a Brazilian-American physician and former politician who served as a member of the Minnesota House of Representatives. A member of the Minnesota Democratic–Farmer–Labor Party (DFL), she represented District 56B in the southern Twin Cities metropolitan area.

Early life and education
Mann and her parents immigrated from Porto Alegre, Brazil to Richfield, Minnesota, when she was eight years old. She attended Johns Hopkins University, graduating with a Master of Public Health, and Meharry Medical College, graduating with a Doctor of Medicine.

Career 
She completed her residency at Mayo Clinic Health System in La Crosse, Wisconsin. Mann is a physician practicing family medicine and emergency medicine.

Minnesota House of Representatives
Mann was first elected to the Minnesota House of Representatives in 2018, defeating Republican incumbent Roz Peterson. She did not run for re-election in the 2020 elections, and was succeeded by Kaela Berg.

Personal life
Mann and her husband, Elliot, have three children. She resides in Lakeville, Minnesota.

References

External links

 Official House of Representatives website
 Official campaign website
 News about Alice

American people of Brazilian descent
American politicians of Brazilian descent
Living people
Democratic Party members of the Minnesota House of Representatives
People from Porto Alegre
People from Lakeville, Minnesota
Brazilian emigrants to the United States
21st-century American politicians
21st-century American women politicians
Women state legislators in Minnesota
Year of birth missing (living people)